Park is a small village in County Londonderry, Northern Ireland. It sits on the banks of the River Faughan and the foothills of the Sperrin Mountains near the village of Claudy. The village adjoins the 120-hectare Learmount Forest; Learmount Castle is situated in the forest, and has stood for hundreds of years.

Sport 
The local sports clubs are St Joseph's Craigbane and St. Mary's GAC Banagher. The teams play at Gerry Crossan Park and Fr. McNally Park respectively.

It also has its own nine-hole golf course, set deep in the Sperrins.

People 
The Irish novelist Antonia Logue was born in Park. 

Kevin Lynch, an Irish Hunger striker was born in Park.

References

External links
St Joseph's Craigbane GAA Club
 Park Festival
NI Neighbourhood Information System

See also 
List of villages in Northern Ireland
List of towns in Northern Ireland

Villages in County Londonderry
Derry and Strabane district